The 500 Ladies Classic was a women's professional golf tournament on the LPGA Tour, played only in 1968.  It was held at the Speedway Golf Course at the Indianapolis Motor Speedway in Indianapolis, Indiana. Mickey Wright won the event at 212 (−4), three strokes ahead of runner-up Kathy Whitworth; it was her 80th tour win.

Winner

See also
Indy Women in Tech Championship – an LPGA Tour event held at Brickyard Crossing, debuted in 2017
500 Festival Open Invitation – a PGA Tour event held at Speedway Golf Course from 1960 to 1968
Brickyard Crossing Championship – the senior tour event was played from 1994 through 2000

References

External links
Results at golfobserver.com

Former LPGA Tour events
Golf in Indiana
Ladies
1968 establishments in Indiana
1968 disestablishments in Indiana
Defunct sports competitions in the United States
History of women in Indiana